Hypolycaena hatita, the common fairy hairstreak, is a butterfly in the family Lycaenidae. It is found in Guinea, Sierra Leone, Liberia, Ivory Coast, Ghana, Togo, Nigeria, Cameroon, Gabon, the Republic of the Congo, the Democratic Republic of the Congo, Ethiopia, Uganda, Kenya, Tanzania, Malawi and Zambia. The habitat consists of primary forests and dense secondary growth.

Adult males have been recorded feeding from bird droppings and are occasionally seen mud-puddling.

The larvae feed on Syzygium species.

Subspecies
Hypolycaena hatita hatita — Guinea, Sierra Leone, Liberia, Ivory Coast, Ghana, Togo, Nigeria: south and the Cross River loop, Cameroon, Gabon, Congo, Democratic Republic of Congo: Mongala, Uele, Ituri, Tshopo, Tshuapa, Kinshasa, Cataractes, Bas-Fleuve, Sankuru and Maniema
Hypolycaena hatita japhusa Riley, 1921 — western Tanzania, Malawi, Zambia: from the Copperbelt northwards, Democratic Republic of Congo: Shaba
Hypolycaena hatita ugandae Sharpe, 1904 — Uganda, western Kenya, north-western Tanzania, Democratic Republic of Congo: Lualaba, Lomani and Kivu

References

External links

Die Gross-Schmetterlinge der Erde 13: Die Afrikanischen Tagfalter. Plate XIII 68 b

Butterflies described in 1865
Hypolycaenini
Butterflies of Africa
Taxa named by William Chapman Hewitson